Gabino Bugallal Araújo, 2nd Count of Bugallal (19 February 1861, in Ponteareas – 30 June 1932, in Paris) was a Spanish politician and Prime Minister of Spain in 1921.

Gabino Bugallal was a member of the Conservative Party in Spain.
He held several important political offices between the years of 1905 and 1921, such as 3 times Minister of the Treasury, Minister of Education, Minister of Justice, Minister of the Interior and Minister of Industry. 
  
Between 8 March and 13 March 1921 he was Prime Minister of Spain after the murder of Eduardo Dato, until he was replaced by Manuel Allendesalazar y Muñoz de Salazar. He was finally Minister of Economy in 1931.

Sources

See also

Related articles 
 A Parda (Pontevedra)

1861 births
1932 deaths
Prime Ministers of Spain
Economy and finance ministers of Spain
Conservative Party (Spain) politicians
People from Ponteareas
Interior ministers of Spain
Presidents of the Congress of Deputies (Spain)